The Rail Vehicle Accessibility (Non-Interoperable Rail System) Regulations 2010 (commonly known as RVAR 2010) is a Statutory Instrument in the United Kingdom. It aims to set standards designed to improve accessibility for disabled people on light rail passenger vehicles.

It came into force on 6 April 2010. The Instrument exercises powers conferred by the Disability Discrimination Act 1995.  It revokes and replaces the Rail Vehicle Accessibility Regulations 1998.

Applicability
RVAR 2010 sets standards designed to improve accessibility for disabled people on light rail vehicle systems for passengers, including metro, underground and tram systems, which are not subject to the Railways (Interoperability) Regulations 2006 (PRM-TSI). RVAR 2010 does not apply to main line rail systems.

The regulations apply to a rail vehicle (as defined by the Instrument) that was first brought into service after 31 December 1998, except if it belongs to a class first brought into use before 1 January 1999.

Regulated Features
RVAR 2010 covers the following areas of a rail vehicle:

 Boarding devices
 Catering
 Doors
 Door controls
 Door handles
 Exterior doorways and through routes
 Interior doorways
 Floors
 Handholds
 Handrails
 Passenger information
 Request-stop controls
 Seats
 Steps
 Toilets
 Transparent surfaces
 Wheelchair spaces

Key Means
The Instrument aims to provide accessibility by ensuring that:

 exterior doors, steps, floors and handrails contrast strongly visually with adjacent areas of the vehicle.
 door handles, door controls and request-stop controls can be used by the widest range of people.
 handrails are provided at doorways, on seat backs and in toilets.
 nominated doorways are accessible to wheelchairs.
 wheelchair spaces and wide throughways to those spaces from the accessible doorways are provided.
 interior glazed panels are clearly marked to aid visibility (or protected).
 passenger information is clearly communicated, both visually and audibly.
 toilets are provided that are accessible to disabled people, including wheelchair users.
 seats are nominated that are accessible to disabled people.
 catering facilities that are provided are accessible to all.
 boarding devices are provided to allow wheelchair users to enter and leave the vehicle.

References

External links 
 Guidance on the Rail Vehicle Accessibility Regulations 1998

Disability legislation
Statutory Instruments of the United Kingdom
2010 in British law
2010 in transport